The 2013 Dutch Basketball Supercup was the 3rd edition of the Dutch Basketball Supercup. The game was played between ZZ Leiden, the winner of the 2012–13 Dutch Basketball League, and SPM Shoeters Den Bosch, the winner of the 2012–13 NBB Cup.

Match details

References

Dutch Basketball Supercup
Supercup